= Alex Olson (artist) =

Abstract painter

- Born: 1978 (age 47–48)
- Education: California Institute of the Arts (MFA); Harvard University (BFA)
- Occupation: Artist

Alex Olson (born 1978) is an American artist based in Los Angeles, CA. Olson is known for her use of impasto paint and visual patterning.

== Early life and education ==
Olson graduated from Harvard University in 2001 with a Bachelor’s degree. She later earned her MFA from the California Institute of the Arts.

== Career ==
Olson’s work typically consists of thick applications of paint and vibrant colors. Drawing from op art and surrealism, her paintings question ways of looking and the tension between the part and the whole.

Olson often refines thick layers of paint using modelling paste and scores their surface. The texture of her pieces suggest several paintings imbedded in one, set atop a background of brushstrokes that neatly curve in different directions.

== Key exhibitions ==
- 2022 Altman Siegel, San Francisco, CA
- 2021 Park View/Paul Soto, Los Angeles, CA
- 2020 Feuilleton, Los Angeles, CA
- 2016 Shane Campbell Gallery, Chicago, IL
- 2015 Laura Bartlett Gallery, London, UK
- 2012 Lisa Cooley, New York, NY
- 2012 Hammer Museum (Group Exhibition), Los Angeles, CA

== Public collections ==
Olson’s work is included in the Los Angeles County Museum of Art, the Museum of Contemporary Art, Chicago, the Hammer Museum, the Walker Art Center, and the Dallas Museum of Art.

== Awards and residencies ==
- 2011 Steep Rock Arts Residency
- 2010 Nancy Graves Foundation Grant
